Tarana is a small town in the Central West of New South Wales, Australia in the City of Lithgow.

It is the former junction of the Oberon Branch railway with the Main Western Line. This branch line was notable for its steep 1 in 30 gradients and sharp  curves.

Heritage listings
Tarana has a number of heritage-listed sites, including:
 Main Western railway: Tarana railway station

References

Towns in New South Wales
City of Lithgow